Gianpiero Villante (born August 18, 1985) is a retired American mixed martial artist who previously fought in the heavyweight division of the Ultimate Fighting Championship. A professional from 2009 to 2021, he also has competed for Strikeforce.

Background
Villante attended MacArthur High School (Levittown, New York) and was part of the Class of 2003.  During his junior year, he placed third in the New York State Wrestling Championships. He followed this up his senior year by winning the New York State Championship at the 215-pound weight class. Villante also earned all-American honors following a 5th-place finish in the 215 lbs weight class at the 2003 NHSCA senior national wrestling tournament. Villante was equally accomplished in football, in which he received the 2002 Thorpe Award winner as the top football player in Nassau County, also the Bill Piner Award as the top linebacker in Nassau County and was named to the High School Heisman All-Star team. Villante drew interest from major Division I schools, such as Penn State and Michigan State. Villante chose to stay home and committed to Hofstra University. Villante attended Hofstra University from 2003 to 2007 where he continued his highly successful football and wrestling careers. Villante started his first game against Marshall University, as a true freshman, at middle linebacker. Gian kept his starting role the rest of his first year. The following season Villante was named a 2004 1st Team Defensive I-AA All-American by The Sports Network. He was regarded as a potential NFL linebacker prospect. The New York Giants, New York Jets, Indianapolis Colts, and Philadelphia Eagles all expressed interest in Villante. Villante wrestled for Hofstra where he became close with NCAA All-American wrestler and future UFC Middleweight Champion Chris Weidman.

Mixed martial arts career

Ring of Combat
Villante made his MMA debut quickly after making the decision to begin MMA training. He defeated MMA veteran Randy Durant by quickly drawing a TKO due to a nasty cut. Villante then flew through his next few opponents, only once having it last through the first round. He quickly was the top Heavyweight contender in Ring of Combat. He got his shot and after defeating Strikeforce veteran Mike Cook for the vacant Ring of Combat Heavyweight title, Villante was touted as a legit MMA prospect.

Villante made his Light Heavyweight debut at Ring of Combat XXIX with aspirations on becoming a champion in two weight classes. However Villante lost by TKO after breaking his elbow and moved back up to heavyweight. After an extended recovery from his wrist injury, Villante had a highlight reel KO win over Joseph Reyes.

Strikeforce
On January 11, 2011, it was announced that Villante had signed a multi-fight deal with Strikeforce. Villante was quickly thrown into a Heavyweight Grand Prix Reserve bout on short notice. His opponent would be Chad Griggs in one of three heavyweight grand prix reserve bouts at Strikeforce: Fedor vs. Silva. In which many people called the fight, the "Fight of the Night." He lost the fight via TKO in the first round on a referee stoppage.

Villante made the decision to drop back down to light heavyweight. In his next bout, Villante would take on undefeated prospect Lorenz Larkin on June 24, 2011, at Strikeforce Challengers: Fodor vs. Terry. After repeatedly taking down Larkin and easily taking the first round, Villante appeared to be suffering from his dramatic weight cutting. Villante began to tire and eventually Larkin went on to win a unanimous decision. Questions began to swirl as to whether or not Villante could effectively complete a Three Round Fight. He was also criticized for not sticking to a wrestling game plan.

In his next fight, Villante took on Keith Berry in the Strikeforce Challengers: Gurgel vs. Duarte preliminary card. Despite the crowd's jeers, and multiple stand ups, Gian continually took down Berry and went on to win the fight unanimously on the judges scorecards.

Villante's next fight was against Trevor Smith on the preliminary card of Strikeforce: Rockhold vs. Jardine on January 7, 2012. Gian quickly attacked Smith catching a leg strike four seconds in. After landing several clean punches and knees on the ground, both stood up. The two trade strikes for about thirty seconds, when Villante once again caught a Smith kick and took him down. Villante held onto the leg and began landing numerous unanswered right hands, prompting referee Kim Winslow to stop the fight at 1:05 of the first round.

Gian continued his win streak with a unanimous decision victory over Derrick Mehmen. This was part of the Strikeforce: Barnett vs. Cormier undercard seen on Showtime Extreme. Gian was credited by announcer Frank Shamrock for his improved standup and his endurance during the fight. Mehmen had visible bruising on his thighs from the multiple leg kicks landed by Villante.

Gian was scheduled to fight undefeated Guto Inocente on the Strikeforce: Melendez vs. Healy main card. The entire card was canceled due to headliner Gilbert Melendez suffering an injury. Without the main event, Showtime canceled the entire event. Gian was featured in Newsday shortly after the announcement. The article featured Gian explaining how he was extremely upset about the cancellation, but focused more on how Gian was finally able to eat, after his grueling ordeal to make weight.

Ultimate Fighting Championship
In January 2013, the Strikeforce organization was closed by its parent company Zuffa.  A list of fighters scheduled to be brought over to the Ultimate Fighting Championship was released in mid-January and Villante was one of the fighters listed.

For his UFC debut, Villante faced fellow promotional newcomer Ovince St. Preux on April 27, 2013, at UFC 159. The fight ended in unusual fashion as St. Preux accidentally poked Villante in the right eye with his thumb and referee Kevin Mulhall immediately called an end to the fight after Villante indicated that he could not see.  As a result of the injury, the fight went to the judges' scorecards and St. Preux won a majority technical decision (30–28, 30–29, and 29–29).

Villante took a short notice bout, replacing Robert Drysdale against Cody Donovan on November 16, 2014, at UFC 167. He won the fight via TKO in the second round, earning his first official UFC victory.

For his third fight with the promotion, Villante faced Fábio Maldonado on March 23, 2014, at UFC Fight Night 38. He lost the fight via unanimous decision.

Villante was expected to face Anthony Perosh on June 28, 2014, at UFC Fight Night 43. However, Perosh was forced out of the bout with an injury and was replaced by Sean O'Connell. He won the fight via split decision. Their performance earned both participants Fight of the Night honors.

Villante was expected to face Corey Anderson on December 6, 2014, at UFC 181. However, Villante pulled out of the fight citing an injury.  Anderson remained on the card against Justin Jones.

The bout with Anderson eventually took place on April 18, 2015, at UFC on Fox 15. Villante won the fight via TKO in the third round.  The fight also earned him his second Fight of the Night bonus award.

Villante faced Tom Lawlor on July 25, 2015, at UFC on Fox 16. Despite controlling the first round with strikes, Villante lost the bout via knockout early in the second round.

Villante faced Anthony Perosh on November 15, 2015, at UFC 193. Villante won the fight via knockout in the first round.

Villante next faced Ilir Latifi on March 5, 2016, at UFC 196. He lost the fight by unanimous decision.

Villante was briefly linked to a bout with Marcos Rogério de Lima on November 12, 2016, at UFC 205. However, Villante pulled out of the fight on September 21 citing a minor injury and the bout was scrapped.
In turn, Villante is expected to face Patrick Cummins the following month on December 9, 2016, at UFC Fight Night 102. Subsequently, Cummins pulled out of the fight on December 2 citing a staph infection. He was replaced by promotional newcomer Saparbek Safarov. Villante won the fight via TKO in the second round. Both participants were awarded Fight of the Night for their performance.

Villante faced Maurício Rua on March 11, 2017, at UFC Fight Night 106. He lost the fight via TKO in the third round.

A rescheduled bout with Patrick Cummins eventually took place on July 22, 2017, at UFC on Fox 25. Villante lost the back-and-forth fight via split decision.

Villante faced Francimar Barroso on January 20, 2018, at UFC 220. He won the fight via split decision .

Villante fought Sam Alvey on June 1, 2018, at UFC Fight Night 131. He lost the fight via split decision.

Villante fought Ed Herman on October 27, 2018, at UFC Fight Night 138. He won the back-and-forth fight via split decision.

Villante faced Michał Oleksiejczuk on February 23, 2019, at UFC Fight Night 145. He lost the fight via TKO due to a body punch early in the first round.

Villante was expected to face Mike Rodriguez on July 13, 2019, at UFC Fight Night 155. However, on July 4, 2019, Villante pulled out of the event for an undisclosed reason and was replaced by John Allan.

Villante faced Maurice Greene on June 27, 2020, at UFC on ESPN: Poirier vs. Hooker. He lost the fight via an arm-triangle choke submission in the third round.

Villante faced Jake Collier on December 5, 2020 at UFC on ESPN 19. He lost the fight via unanimous decision.

Villante fought Chris Barnett on November 6, 2021 at UFC 268. He lost the fight via TKO in round two after getting knocked down via a spinning wheel kick. Villante announced his retirement after the fight, and planned to return to football as a coach.

Personal life
Villante is Italian American. He and his long-time girlfriend Katie have a son, Gianluca, who was born in December 2019.

Championships and accomplishments

Mixed martial arts
Ultimate Fighting Championship
Fight of the Night (Three times)
Ring of Combat
Ring of Combat Heavyweight Championship (One time)
Ring of Combat Light Heavyweight Championship (One time)
MMAJunkie.com
2015 April Fight of the Month vs. Corey Anderson

Football
High school football
2001 All-Section VIII Linebacker
2001 All-Long Island Linebacker (Sect VIII&XI)
2002 All-Section VIII Linebacker
2002 All-Long Island Linebacker (Sect VIII&XI)
2002 Piner Award (Best Linebacker – Section VIII – Nassau County)
2002 Thorpe Award (Best Football Player – Section VIII – Nassau County)
2002 1st Team All-New York State
2002 1st All-Metro Team (Lower NY-Upper NJ)
College football
2004 2nd Team Defensive All-Atlantic 10
2004 1st Team Defensive I-AA All-American
2006 1st Team Defensive All-Atlantic 10
2007 1st Team Defensive All-Colonial Conference

Wrestling
High school wrestling
2002 Section VIII Nassau County Champion (215 lbs)
2002 New York State 3rd Place (215 lbs)
2003 Section VIII Nassau County Champion (215 lbs)
2003 New York State Champion (215 lbs)

Mixed martial arts record

|-
|Loss
|align=center|17–14
|Chris Barnett
|TKO (spinning wheel kick and punches)
|UFC 268
|
|align=center|2
|align=center|2:23	
|New York City, New York, United States
|
|-
|Loss
|align=center|17–13
|Jake Collier
|Decision (unanimous)
|UFC on ESPN: Hermansson vs. Vettori
|
|align=center|3
|align=center|5:00
|Las Vegas, Nevada, United States
|
|-
|Loss
|align=center|17–12
|Maurice Greene
|Submission (arm-triangle choke)
|UFC on ESPN: Poirier vs. Hooker
|
|align=center|3
|align=center|3:44
|Las Vegas, Nevada, United States
|
|-
|Loss
|align=center|17–11
|Michał Oleksiejczuk
|TKO (body punch)
|UFC Fight Night: Błachowicz vs. Santos 
|
|align=center|1
|align=center|1:34
|Prague, Czech Republic
|
|-
|Win
|align=center|17–10
|Ed Herman
| Decision (split) 
|UFC Fight Night: Volkan vs. Smith 
|
|align=center|3
|align=center|5:00
|Moncton, New Brunswick, Canada
|  
|-
|Loss
|align=center|16–10
|Sam Alvey
|Decision (split) 
|UFC Fight Night: Rivera vs. Moraes
|
|align=center|3
|align=center|5:00
|Utica, New York, United States
|
|-
|Win
|align=center|16–9
|Francimar Barroso
|Decision (split)
|UFC 220 
|
|align=center|3
|align=center|5:00
|Boston, Massachusetts, United States
|
|-
|Loss
|align=center|15–9
|Patrick Cummins
|Decision (split)
|UFC on Fox: Weidman vs. Gastelum 
|
|align=center|3
|align=center|5:00
|Uniondale, New York, United States
|
|-
|Loss
|align=center|15–8
|Maurício Rua
|TKO (punches)
|UFC Fight Night: Belfort vs. Gastelum
|
|align=center|3
|align=center|0:59
|Fortaleza, Brazil
|
|-
|Win
|align=center|15–7
|Saparbek Safarov
|TKO (punches)
|UFC Fight Night: Lewis vs. Abdurakhimov
|
|align=center|2
|align=center|2:54
|Albany, New York, United States
|
|-
|Loss
|align=center|14–7
|Ilir Latifi
|Decision (unanimous)
|UFC 196
|
|align=center|3
|align=center|5:00
|Las Vegas, Nevada, United States
|
|-
| Win
| align=center| 14–6 
| Anthony Perosh
| KO (punch)
| UFC 193
| 
| align=center| 1
| align=center| 2:56
| Melbourne, Australia
| 
|-
| Loss
| align=center| 13–6
| Tom Lawlor
| KO (punch)
| UFC on Fox: Dillashaw vs. Barão 2
| 
| align=center| 2
| align=center| 0:27
| Chicago, Illinois, United States
| 
|-
| Win
| align=center| 13–5
| Corey Anderson
| TKO (punches)
| UFC on Fox: Machida vs. Rockhold 
| 
| align=center| 3
| align=center| 4:18
| Newark, New Jersey, United States
| |
|-
| Win
| align=center| 12–5
| Sean O'Connell
| Decision (split) 
| UFC Fight Night: Te Huna vs. Marquardt
| 
| align=center| 3
| align=center| 5:00
| Auckland, New Zealand
| 
|-
| Loss
| align=center| 11–5
| Fábio Maldonado
| Decision (unanimous)
| UFC Fight Night: Shogun vs. Henderson 2
| 
| align=center| 3
| align=center| 5:00
| Natal, Brazil
| 
|-
| Win
| align=center| 11–4
| Cody Donovan
| TKO (punches)
| UFC 167
| 
| align=center| 2
| align=center| 1:22
| Las Vegas, Nevada, United States
| 
|-
| Loss
| align=center| 10–4
| Ovince Saint Preux
| Technical Decision (majority)
| UFC 159
| 
| align=center| 3
| align=center| 0:33
| Newark, New Jersey, United States
| 
|-
| Win
| align=center| 10–3
| Derrick Mehmen
| Decision (unanimous)
| Strikeforce: Barnett vs. Cormier
| 
| align=center| 3
| align=center| 5:00
| San Jose, California, United States
| 
|-
| Win
| align=center| 9–3
| Trevor Smith
| TKO (punches)
| Strikeforce: Rockhold vs. Jardine
| 
| align=center| 1
| align=center| 1:05
| Las Vegas, Nevada, United States
| 
|-
| Win
| align=center| 8–3
| Keith Berry
| Decision (unanimous)
| Strikeforce Challengers: Gurgel vs. Duarte
| 
| align=center| 3
| align=center| 5:00
| Las Vegas, Nevada, United States
| 
|-
| Loss
| align=center| 7–3
| Lorenz Larkin
| Decision (unanimous)
| Strikeforce Challengers: Fodor vs. Terry
| 
| align=center| 3
| align=center| 5:00
| Kent, Washington, United States
| 
|-
| Loss
| align=center| 7–2
| Chad Griggs
| TKO (punches)
| Strikeforce: Fedor vs. Silva
| 
| align=center| 1
| align=center| 2:49
| East Rutherford, New Jersey, United States
| 
|-
| Win
| align=center| 7–1
| Joseph Reyes
| TKO (punches)
| Ring of Combat 33
| 
| align=center| 1
| align=center| 1:03
| Atlantic City, New Jersey, United States
| 
|-
| Loss
| align=center| 6–1
| Demetrius Richards
| TKO (arm injury)
| Ring of Combat 29
| 
| align=center| 1
| align=center| 3:27
| Atlantic City, New Jersey, United States
| 
|-
| Win
| align=center| 6–0
| Mike Cook
| Submission (rear-naked choke)
| Ring of Combat 28
| 
| align=center| 1
| align=center| 1:36
| Atlantic City, New Jersey, United States
| 
|-
| Win
| align=center| 5–0
| Marcelo Pereira
| KO (punch)
| Ring of Combat 27
| 
| align=center| 1
| align=center| 3:59
| Atlantic City, New Jersey, United States
|
|-
| Win
| align=center| 4–0
| Rob Wince
| KO (head kick)
| Ring of Combat 26
| 
| align=center| 2
| align=center| 1:25
| Atlantic City, New Jersey, United States
| 
|-
| Win
| align=center| 3–0
| Joe Abouata
| TKO (punches)
| Ring of Combat 25
| 
| align=center| 1
| align=center| 1:48
| Atlantic City, New Jersey, United States
| 
|-
| Win
| align=center| 2–0
| Paul White
| Submission (rear-naked choke)
| Ring of Combat 24
| 
| align=center| 1
| align=center| 1:46
| Atlantic City, New Jersey, United States
| 
|-
| Win
| align=center| 1–0
| Randy Durant
| TKO (doctor stoppage)
| Ring of Combat 23
| 
| align=center| 1
| align=center| 0:35
| Atlantic City, New Jersey, United States
| 
|-

See also

 List of male mixed martial artists

References

External links
 
 

Living people
1985 births
American male mixed martial artists
Mixed martial artists from New York (state)
Light heavyweight mixed martial artists
Mixed martial artists utilizing kickboxing
Mixed martial artists utilizing collegiate wrestling
Mixed martial artists utilizing Brazilian jiu-jitsu
Heavyweight mixed martial artists
American people of Italian descent
People from Wantagh, New York
Hofstra Pride football players
People from Levittown, New York
People from Bellmore, New York
Ultimate Fighting Championship male fighters
American male sport wrestlers
Amateur wrestlers
American practitioners of Brazilian jiu-jitsu
Sportspeople from Nassau County, New York